Manuel Moriche Mostajo (born in Zaragoza, 6 August 1950), is a Spanish former rugby union player and currently, commentator. 

He had 59 caps for the Spain national team between 1970 and 1983. He played as fly-half and was considered the best Spanish rugby union player of the 1970s.

Career 
He grew up in Valladolid and was educated at Colegio El Salvador by the French priest George Bernès, who introduced rugby in the city in the 1960s. With the El Salvador club he played three sesasons Liga Nacional achieving ending runner-up twice and earning a third place.Due to the college direction board not renovating his sports license, Moriche moved to Madrid to play for Club Deportivo Arquitectura, with which he won 5 league titles and two Copa del Rey titles. In 1974 he played temporarily for Veterinaria Zaragoza in the second division, due to his conscription. In 1978 he left Madrid to play two seasons for Futbol Club Barcelona, returning to Arquitectura in 1980. He was the brains of the best team of the national panorama and of the national team during these years, and at the time of his retirement, he was the most capped Spanish player of the history.

Currently, Manolo Moriche is most known for his journalistic work he practices since the 1990s commentating rugby union matches for Canal+ and Movistar+.

References

External links 
 80 años de historia

Spanish rugby union players
1950 births
Living people
Rugby union fly-halves
Sportspeople from Zaragoza
20th-century Spanish people